Roland Fanning is a baseball coach and former player, who is the current head baseball coach of the Austin Peay Governors. He played college baseball at Carl Albert State, Northern Oklahoma Enid and Southeastern Oklahoma.

Playing career
Fanning grew up in Coalgate, Oklahoma, where he attended Coalgate High School, where he was a letterwinner for the Wildcats in baseball, but also participated in football. After high school, Fanning played college baseball at Carl Albert State and Northern Oklahoma Enid for a year apiece, before finishing his career as a two-year starter for Southeastern Oklahoma.

Coaching career
Fanning began his coaching career at the conclusion of his playing career, joining the staff of his alma mater, Southeastern Oklahoma. He would spend 5 years with the Savage Storm, helping them win the Lone Star Conference championship in 2011. In the fall of 2012, Fanning was named the volunteer assistant for the Oklahoma State Cowboys.

In July, 2014, Fanning joined the Little Rock Trojans staff, to serve as an assistant coach and recruiting coordinator. Just two years later, Fanning left Little Rock for the same position with Kentucky. He returned to Oklahoma State from 2020 to 2022, where he served as the Director of Baseball Operations.</ref>

In late May of 2022, Fanning was named the 12th head baseball coach of the Austin Peay Governors.

Head coaching record

References

External links
Austin Peay Governors bio

Living people

Year of birth missing (living people)
Austin Peay Governors baseball coaches
Carl Albert Vikings baseball players
Kentucky Wildcats baseball coaches
Little Rock Trojans baseball coaches
Northern Oklahoma Jets baseball players
Oklahoma State Cowboys baseball coaches
Southeastern Oklahoma State Savage Storm baseball coaches
Southeastern Oklahoma State Savage Storm baseball players